

 
Fleming is a town and locality in the Northern Territory of Australia located about  south of the territory capital of Darwin.

The locality is named after the town which was named after the brothers, Jim and Mike Fleming, who are considered to be the first pastoralists in this part of the Northern Territory.  Part of the town was established on land partly located in the former Oolloo Station pastoral lease established by Jim Fleming in 1907.  The town was gazetted on 20 March 1996 and the locality was gazetted on 4 April 2007.

For the 2016 Australian census which was conducted in August 2016, the population of the locality of Fleming (if any) was counted with that in the surrounding locality of Douglas-Daly to find that 238 people were living within the two localities.

Fleming is located within the federal division of Lingiari, the territory electoral division of Daly and the local government area of the Victoria Daly Shire.

References

Notes

Citations

Towns in the Northern Territory
Victoria Daly Region